Alice Patterson may refer to:
 Alice Pennefather (1903–1983), Singaporean badminton and tennis player, née Patterson
Alice Patterson, original co-owner of Patterson House (Larned, Kansas), built 1949
Alice Patterson, leader of Justice at the Gate, American religious organisation
Alice Patterson (American tennis player), competitor in 1916 U.S. National Championships – Women's Singles